Missing is 2016 South Korean mystery film starring Uhm Ji-won and Gong Hyo-jin. It was released on November 30, 2016.

Plot

Ji-sun is a workaholic divorced woman working at a PR Company. Her job doesn't leave her with a lot of time to spend with her 1-year-old daughter, Da-eun. Once, when her former nanny, a Chinese woman, had hit and injured Da-eun, Ji-sun had fired her but not being accustomed to taking care of her little girl, she had desperately been in need of a new nanny. Enter, Han-Mae, a young Chinese woman claiming to have a lot of experience with kids. Due to her poor conversational skills, Ji-sun had been hesitant in employing her, but when she managed to calm a crying Da-eun down within seconds, Ji-sun changed her mind and employed her immediately. She had also been entangled in a custody battle with her ex-husband, Jang Jin-hyuk, for her daughter. While her husband, a physician by profession, himself isn't too keen to have his daughter, her mother-in-law doesn't want to give up her granddaughter.

One day she received a call from her lawyer asking why she had not reached the court yet. Turns out Han-Mae had received the notice but had not mentioned it to Ji-sun, not knowing the importance of the document. She goes looking for Han-Mae to confront her about the mail, but neither she nor Da-eun are in the house. Ji-sun recalls that she had mentioned going to the clinic for Da-eun's vaccination. In the court, the judge reaches the conclusion that due to her workaholic nature and mental instability due to work and her divorce, Ji-sun had been told to hand over the girl to her in-laws months ago, but she did not abide by it. Her lawyer advises her to beg to her husband to let her keep the girl since there was no other way for her to achieve that.

On reaching home, Ji-sun finds it weird that none of the chores are done and on searching the house, Han-Mae and Da-eun are still not home. She goes around the neighbourhood, calling their names and starts becoming worried when she doesn't get any answer back. Her calls to Han-Mae also go unanswered. The security guard calls Han-Mae's protectiveness towards Da-eun peculiar. She even goes all the way to China-town to look for Han-mae, but that's a dead-end. Growing tired from all the worrying, Ji-sun falls asleep only to be woken up the next morning by her mother-in-law banging on the door. She has come to take Da-eun away. Ji-sun avoids her and heads for her car, determined to find Da-eun. She goes to the clinic that Han-Mae said she would take Da-eun to, only to find out that they had last come in 2 days ago and she had filled a prescription for a month's worth of flu medicines for the baby, something that mothers do when going on a long trip with their babies. To top it off, her neighbour's nanny, who had introduced Han-Mae to her as her niece, calls her back after getting a frantic voice-message from her. To Ji-sun's horror, she tells her that Han-Mae was not her niece and that she had paid her to introduce her in such a way. She reaches the police-station, now growing suspicious of Han-Mae. Her lawyer calls her after getting a call from her husband's lawyer, suspecting that she is trying to hide Da-Eun so her mother-in-law won't be able to take her away. He warns her of the price she would have to pay if does anything like that. Scared, she runs away from the police station not even realising that Han-Mae had forged her Foreigner Identification documents and the actual Piao Han-Mae was someone else.

She reaches home where she sees a man lurking around her flat. She grows suspicious of him when she recalls seeing him in front of her flat a few days ago as well. On confronting him, he reveals that Han-Mae owes him some money and he came here in order to get it back. She tells him that Han-Mae and her daughter have gone missing and he takes her to a Prostitution Bar in China-town, where Han-Mae used to work before. He takes her to a room where all the girls are waiting and in her paranoia, she mistakes another girl for Han-Mae and walks in on her and a customer in a room. The owner sympathises with her once she hears that her daughter is missing and promises to call her if she ever comes across or hears news of Han-Mae.

Just as she leaves the bar, she gets a call from a man claiming to have her daughter hostage. The man warns her not to calls the police and scares her even more when she hears Da-eun and Han-Mae's voices crying for help. Scared, she transfers all the money she has in her account to the kidnapper and is then instructed to go to the Yeouido Wharf. She runs around shouting Da-eun's name when she reaches the wharf, only to be greeted by a bag of her toys by the river, one of which she had bought for her very recently. The police arrive there shortly, Ji-sun having called them on the way.

She finally goes to the police station to lodge a missing person's report and the officer, Detective Park, finds it suspicious that she is lodging the report so late, having last seen the duo 2 days ago. She also realises that the call earlier had just been a Voice phishing call. Since Han-Mae can't be contacted at the moment, the police ask her to provide their photos. But, while there are plenty of Da-eun's photos, surprisingly, there is not even a single photo of Han-Mae in her phone while she distinctly remembers the 3 of them clicking a photo together on Da-eun's 1st birthday. In the midst of this, her mother-in-law bursts into the police station and demands to know where Ji-sun is hiding her daughter. She claims that Ji-sun and Han-Mae are working together in order to hide Da-eun. This is news to Detective Park who then proceeds to call her lawyer. He finds it suspicious as well that her daughter disappeared just days after she was served a detention. He tells her how big the problem is considering she doesn't even know Han-Mae's personal details and that her Foreigner ID was fake and even her phone was a burner phone.

She slips out of the police station and goes straight to her building, analysing the CCTV tapes from Thursday. She sees that they left on Thursday morning and were not seen since then. While she is reviewing the tapes, the security guard brings a high-schooler with him. The boy tells her that he had seen Han-Mae once, back when the other Chinese nanny was working for Ji-sun. The woman had brought Da-eun out shopping for fruits and were on their way back when a woman on a bicycle kept circling them. She had jerked the bag of fruits out of the nanny's hand, who then ran after it to collect the fallen produce. While the nanny was distracted, the woman had unbuckled Da-eun's safety belt and pushed the stroller downhill, causing it to crash and resulting in Da-Eun getting seriously injured. The high-schooler had revealed himself then and the woman had given him her bicycle and instructed him to keep quiet. It is now that we see that the woman was indeed Han-mae.

Distressed by this new information, Ji-sun hurriedly drives out her building premises just as the detectives come in to see her. With the resolution that she will find Da-eun on her own, she goes back to the bar. While she is waiting on the couch for the girl she had seen the other day, the owner tells Ji-sun how similar her and Han-Mae's habits are, referring to their shared habit of scratching the couch in their nervousness. In a flashback, we see Han-Mae when she had first come to the bar, looking for a job. In her broken Korean, she had promised to work hard because she needed money. She had given her the name 목련 (Mok-ryeon - Magnolia). Just then a customer had walked in, who turned out to be Park Hyeon-ik, the man who had brought her there before. He had fallen in love with Han-Mae at first sight and had grown closer since he knew how to speak Mandarin. During one of their sessions, she had asked him about local anesthesia and had told him that she wanted to give her liver to someone. Mysteriously, she went somewhere every day at 2pm and stayed out for 2–3 hours at a time. She never told anyone where she went. Amongst the things she left behind at the bar, Ji-Sun is surprised to find a photo of a baby. At the back of the photo, she finds the name of the studio and the date on which the photo was taken.

While Ji-Sun goes in search of 'Mihwa Studio', she ignores calls from the detectives and her husband. At the police station, CCTV footage shows her entering the lift with Park Hyeon-ik, who seems to be well known amongst the detectives. While they decide to look up Park Hyeon-ik, Ji-sun reaches the location of Mihwa Studio, which has now been renamed to 'Baby Love Studio'. Reaching the gates, she suddenly hears Da-eun calling out to her. Following the voice she sets out into the dark town. She seems to be in a nightmare as she sees Han-Mae and Da-eun and remembers her husband and mother-in-law admonishing her and she sees Han-Mae, with her back towards Ji-sun, holding a bloody Da-Eun. As she turns around, Ji-sun's face is seen covered in blood and she wakes up from her nightmare with a start, having fallen asleep in her car.

She wakes up just in time to see the owner opening shop for the day. He tells her that the photo was taken before the remodeling of the shop. He finds the negatives of the photo she brought and Han-Mae was indeed the mother of the child, so protective that she didn't even let the owner hold her daughter. He had registered the father's name as Han Suk-ho and the mother's name as Kim Yeon. The detectives come to the bar, having come across the same information. They find Han-Mae suspicious, having come to Korea after marriage, had a baby, then disguised herself as a nanny with a fake name and disappeared with the baby. They also suspect that she and Park Hyeon-ik conspired together. Meanwhile, Ji-sun pays a visit to Han-Mae's last known address in Chungcheong, having gotten it from the studio owner. She pays a visit to the now empty house but is soon interrupted by a neighbour who empathised with Han-Mae as his wife was a foreigner as well. They remember coming to their house so that the 2 women could learn Korean together, but her mother-in-law and husband had strongly refused that. She is abused by both of them, both physically and emotionally, for not speaking the same language and for not being able to provide a child. They punish her by cutting off her long hair which draws sympathy from the neighbour's wife. He further tells her how things improved a bit when she finally conceived and she became much happier.

But things went back to being worse when one day her daughter, Jae-In, got sick. Having told to go to a hospital to avoid complications, her in-laws take the child away from her and leave in their car not wanting to spend much on a girl, leaving Han-Mae stranded in front of the clinic. She had run after the car, pleading and crying, but to no avail and that was the last time the neighbour saw her, having run away with her daughter a few days later. She had then once contacted the wife to tell her that her daughter got better after treatment in Seoul and she shows her a picture of the healthy baby. That is when the police chase her and take her to the police station. Han-Mae's mother-in-law is there to report her son missing since the last 2 days, but Ji-sun can't connect the names. She looks at the photo of the baby and realises the hospital she got treated at must be the Gangnam Catholic Hospital (the same hospital her husband works at), having seen an ID tag from the hospital amongst her belongings in the bar. The detectives release 'Missing' posters of Jae-in and it is revealed that Jae-in suffered from Congenital Biliary Atresia and she needed a liver transplant. She was not a suitable match and the father never got tested. They connect the dots and figure out that that must be why she abducted Da-eun, the process being easier with Hyeon-ik being an infamous Organ Trafficker. An elderly nurse at the hospital seems to recognise the kid, but keeps it to herself when no one seems interested in hearing her out.

The detectives head to an accident site where a man fitting Han Suk-ho's description is burnt inside the car. Ji-Sun is relieved to hear that no kid's body was found but is a little disturbed to hear that the accident must have taken back a week ago. A flashback from a week ago shows us that Han-Mae had returned home late in the night and Ji-sun, worried for her, had walked in on her undressing - her face was a nervous sweaty mess and her back had scars from abuse. In the present, Ji-sun enters the hospital with the detectives when she hears the same lullaby that Han-Mae used to sing. Following the sound, it turns out to be the elderly nurse from before. She tells them that Han-Mae was famous in the hospital as 'The Singing Chinese Woman'. People were subconsciously attracted to her when she sang to her daughter, some nurses stopping to listen to her. She had come across some financial problems with her daughter's hospital bills and had asked Hyeon-ik for help. He had convinced her to sell her organs in exchange for money, but help didn't come fast enough and her daughter was forcibly discharged. She hit her surgery site and started bleeding and in an attempt to get up, she accidentally snatched Ji-sun's husband's ID card. Looking back at the bed her daughter had just occupied, Han-Mae looks at the new occupant with hatred, the new occupant being Da-eun.

The nature of the case is changed to a Case of Kidnapping and Ji-sun goes home to a crowd of investigators, now investigating from a new angle. In a flashback, Da-eun was taken to the hospital for acute Pneumonia and her father was furious at her not being given a bed and for being kept in the ER for hours. Being an employee, he had pulled some strings and forcibly discharged Han Jae-in and this realisation strikes Ji-sun as she feels that that is where it all began. As she moves to the table, she sees a patchwork quilt that Han-Mae had made herself and embroidered the name 'Jae-in' at the back. She recalls back to how she had once fed her frozen kimchi. This prompts her to search the kimchi fridge. As she throws down all the boxes in the fridge, she comes across a cooler at the bottom. She opens the box and inside is a body of a child wearing the same clothes that Da-eun was wearing on her 1st birthday. She collapses in shock while her mother-in-law insists that the child is not Da-eun.

We flashback to after Han-Mae had discharged Jae-in and taken her home with her. Yellow with disease and burning with fever, Jae-in became very sick. Han-Mae ran out with Jae-in in her arms, but stopped on the way when she realised that Jae-in had already died. She broke down in the middle of the street, loudly mourning her loss. In the present, Ji-sun slips out of the house now filled with detectives and goes to sit on the swing in the playground. She remembers one day when she had come home to see Han-Mae sitting on the same swing with Da-Eun in her arms and how she had been so fond of her, even making plans to go to the beach in summer.

Park Hyeon-ik is taken into questioning where he refuses to disclose anything about Han-Mae, willing to take the fall himself. But he wavers when Ji-Sun falls at her feet and says she will do any thing and everything, begging him to return Da-eun to her. Another flashback takes us shortly after Jae-in had been discharged. He had given her the money which she then gave to her husband, as without his consent Jae-in couldn't be treated. We also see that he had indeed brought the money as soon as he could, running to her. But he was still late as he reached the hospital to find Han-Mae sitting outside with Jae-in in her arms, anger burning in her eyes. In the present, Hyeon-ik explains to Ji-sun that he didn't see her after that incident until a month ago when she asked him to kill her husband. When he hesitates, she offers Da-eun in exchange, saying that he could either ask for ransom or sell her off somewhere. But she had not held up her end of the deal and had run off with Da-Eun instead. Ji-sun vows to kill her if she touches a hair on Da-eun's body. Seeing her grieved, Hyeon-ik says that she had asked him to make a passport for her baby long ago, having had plans to go back to her country after earning some money. But now her baby's dead, so everyone joins the dots and assume she wants to flee with Da-eun.

The closest escape route seems to be a China bound ship for 1pm, and everyone heads there. Running into the boat when the officers are not looking, Ji-sun goes from room to room looking for the 2 when she spots them outside the window of a room. She runs to them but Han-Mae spots her before she can reach her and a chase ensues, resulting in the two women facing off on the hull. Han-Mae is in an illusion, thinking that Da-eun is Jae-in. She threatens to jump off when she sees herself surrounded by the police. Ji-sun tries to lure her with the patchwork quilt that Han-mae had made for Jae-in. She wavers after seeing the quilt. Ji-sun offers to jump off the ship herself as she apologises for the hospital incident, saying that Da-sun doesn't deserve to die and she wouldn't like to see her die either as she knows that Han-mae loves Da-eun as well. As she looks down at Da-eun, she sees Jae-in instead and finally realising that she is not her daughter, she hands Da-eun to Detective Park. Out of grief, Han-Mae jumps off the ship as Ji-sun throws herself after her to save her. She catches hold of her, but Han-Mae pulls her hand away from Ji-sun and she goes further and further down the deep sea, clutching Jae-in's quilt. As she goes down, she thinks back to the time she was pregnant with Jae-in and was telling her that she was going to make her the happiest baby in the world.

Ji-sun wakes up in her hospital bed, her first thought being Da-eun. The nurse brings her outside where she sees Da-eun playing with the other kids. Ji-sun kneels down and calls for Da-eun. She gets a bit depressed when Da-eun doesn't react to her at first, but then starts tearing up when she gets up and toddles towards Ji-sun, walking straight into her open arms and calling her "Mama".

Cast

Uhm Ji-won as Lee Ji-sun
Gong Hyo-jin as Han Mae / Kim Yeon
Kim Hee-won as Park Sung-ho
Park Hae-joon as Park Hyun-ik
Seo Ha-nui as Jang Da-eun
Kim Ga-ryul as Han Jae-in / Jane
Jun Suk-chan as Detective Nam
Lee Sung-wook as Detective Seo 
Jo Dal-hwan as Lawyer Min
Go Jun as Jang Jin-hyuk
Jang Won-young as Han Suk-ho
Kim Jin-goo as Suk-ho's mother
Kim Ji-hoon as Kim Yi-jang
Ramirez Cherrish as Suzan
Ham Sung-min as Boy in school uniform
Gil Hae-yeon as Ji-sun's mother-in-Law
Kim Sun-young as Bar owner
Seo Eun-ah as Soo-ryun

Reception
The film was released on November 30, 2016.

Release
The film's rights were sold to numerous Asian countries including Japan, Singapore, Brunei, Cambodia, Indonesia, Laos, Malaysia, Myanmar, Nepal, Philippines, Vietnam, Thailand and Sri Lanka.

A Chinese remake titled Lost, Found was released in 2018.

Awards and nominations

References

External links
 
Missing on Hancinema
Missing on Korean Film Council

2016 films
2010s Korean-language films
2010s mystery films
South Korean mystery films
Films about child abduction
2010s Mandarin-language films
2010s South Korean films